This is a list of seasons completed by the Yale Bulldogs football team of the National Collegiate Athletic Association (NCAA) Division I Football Championship Subdivision (FCS). Since the team's inaugural 1872 season, Yale has participated in more than 1,300 officially sanctioned games, holding an all-time record of 917–380–55. The Bulldogs originally competed as a football independent before joining the Ivy League as a founding member in 1956.

Seasons

See also 
 List of Ivy League football standings

References

Yale

Yale Bulldogs football seasons